Skjærsjøen is a regulated lake in Nordmarka, Oslo, Norway. It drains through the river Skjærsjøelva to Maridalsvannet, and also via pipe to the Hammeren Hydroelectric Power Station. It is regulated by the dam Skjærsjødammen built in 1890.

References

Lakes of Oslo
Reservoirs in Norway